Father Frank Bwalya is a former Zambian Roman Catholic priest now working for the ruling Patriotic Front after the death of its founder Michael Sata.

He has held positions as Chairperson for Broadcasting for the Media Institute of Southern Africa - Zambia for 2007–2008, and he worked for Radio Icengelo in 2007.

He has had a number of brushes with the law, after suggesting that the presidential election was fraudulent.

He was arrested in March 2010 and charged with conduct likely to cause a breach of peace during a rally held to mark youth day in Kitwe north of the capital Lusaka.

Bwalya flashed a card painted red when he joined the celebrations - which police said signified a call to remove the government. He pleaded not guilty and was released on bail.

He gained controversy in May 2013, when he announced that if elected president, he would refuse to arrest gays and lesbians for sexual activity and announced his support for marriage equality.

Bwalya was charged with defamation following a radio broadcast in January 2014, where he referred to President Michael Sata as "chumbu mushololwa".  The Bemba term refers to a sweet potato's bent shape that breaks when one tries to straighten it and is used to describe someone who does not heed advice.  He was acquitted on July 15, 2014 with the court finding that he was merely exercising his right to free speech.

He was appointed Board Chairman of the state owned Zambia Electricity Supply Corporation Limited, but resigned sighting inability to independently criticize the government of Michael Sata while serving in a parastatal.

After falling out with Michael Sata, Fr Frank Bwalya went on to form his own political party called Alliance for a Better Zambia

He became a staunch supporter of then Presidential candidate Edgar Lungu after the death of President Michael Chilufya Sata 28 October 2014.

Father Frank Bwalya in 2016 reported opposition UPND Vice President and former colleague Geofrey Bwalya Mwamba popularly known as GBM to the police for threatening to harm the President Edgar Lungu. GBM was arrested and subsequently spent 3 nights in prison and was later released on bail.

Nowadays Fr Frank Bwalya is perceived by many especially from the opposition as a PF cadre than a political activist he once was.

References

Living people
21st-century Roman Catholic priests
Zambian LGBT rights activists
Year of birth missing (living people)